Rancho San Ramon (Amador) land grant in Contra Costa County, California
 Rancho San Ramon (Pacheco-Castro) land grant in present-day Contra Costa County, California